Events in the year 1885 in Portugal.

Incumbents
 Monarch: Louis I
 Prime Minister: de Melo

Events
 The Berlin Conference for regulating European colonization and trade in Africa
 Signing of the Treaty of Simulambuco.

Arts and entertainment

Sports

Births
 13 October – Francisco António Real, sports shooter.
 2 November – Cosme Damião, Portuguese football player and manager (d. 1947)

Deaths

 13 November – Anselmo José Braamcamp, politician (born 1817)
 15 December – Fernando II of Portugal, King of Portugal as husband of Queen Dona Maria II of Portugal from the birth of their son in 1837 to her death in 1853 (born 1816)

References

 
1880s in Portugal
Portugal
Years of the 19th century in Portugal
Portugal